"Ready 1" is a song by Australian rock band Grinspoon which was released 18 October 1999 as the lead single from their second studio album, Easy. It peaked at No. 36 on the ARIA Singles Chart. It was written by band members Phil Jamieson and Pat Davern. Jamieson has also performed the song as a solo artist.

Track listing
 "Ready 1"
 "New York Picture Show"
 "Ready 1" (demo)
 "Ready 1 (Drunken Lounge Version)"

Charts

References

1999 singles
Grinspoon songs
1999 songs
Universal Records singles
Songs written by Phil Jamieson
Songs written by Pat Davern